Yugambeh may refer to:
Yugambeh people, an Aboriginal Australian people of South-East Queensland and the Northern Rivers of New South Wales
Yugambeh language, their language
Yugambeh Museum, a museum of their culture and language
 Yugambeh–Bundjalung languages, a language family